The Figure Skating Federation of Armenia is the regulating body of figure skating in Armenia, governed by the Armenian Olympic Committee. The headquarters of the federation is located in Yerevan.

History
The Figure Skating Federation of Armenia was founded in 1994 and is currently led by Melanya Stepanyan. The Federation became a full member of the International Skating Union (ISU) in 2006.

ISU Junior Grand Prix in Armenia

The ISU Junior Grand Prix in Armenia is an international figure skating competition, organized and hosted by the Figure Skating Federation of Armenia. Medals may be awarded in the disciplines of men's singles, ladies' singles, pair skating, and ice dancing.

See also
 International figure skating
 List of member federations of the International Skating Union
 Sport in Armenia
 Yerevan Figure Skating and Hockey Sports School

References

External links 
 Figure Skating Federation of Armenia on Facebook

Sports governing bodies in Armenia
Figure skating in Armenia
Armenia